The 2023 Sun Belt Conference Men's Basketball Tournament was the postseason men's basketball tournament for Sun Belt Conference during the 2022–23 NCAA Division I men's basketball season. All tournament games were played at Pensacola Bay Center between February 28–March 6. The winner, Louisiana, received the Sun Belt's automatic bid to the 2023 NCAA Tournament.

Seeds 
All 14 conference teams will qualify for the tournament. Teams will be seeded by record within the conference, with a tiebreaker system to seed teams with identical conference records. The top 10 teams will receive a first round bye and the top four teams received a double bye, automatically advancing them into the quarterfinals.

Schedule

Bracket

References 

2022–23 Sun Belt Conference men's basketball season
Sun Belt Conference men's basketball tournament
Basketball competitions in Florida
College sports in Florida
Sports in Pensacola, Florida
Sun Belt Conference men's basketball tournament
Sun Belt Conference men's basketball tournament